United States federal government chartered and owned corporations are a separate set of corporations chartered and owned by the federal government, which operate to provide public services, but unlike the federal agencies (e.g., the Environmental Protection Agency, the Bureau of Indian Affairs, etc.), or the federal independent commissions (e.g., the Federal Communications Commission, the Nuclear Regulatory Commission, etc.), they have a separate legal personality from the federal government, providing the highest level of political independence. They sometimes receive federal budgetary appropriations, but some also have independent sources of revenue.

Federal-government-acquired corporations
The federal-government-acquired corporations are a separate set of corporations that were originally chartered and created by an entity other than the U.S. federal government, but that were, at some point, nationalized by the federal government.  Most of these are corporations temporarily in possession of the government as a result of a seizure of property of a debtor to the government, such as a delinquent taxpayer; usually, these are awaiting liquidation at auction, and most are too small to note.  However, there are also corporations that the federal government has nationalized to ensure the continued provision of an essential service or services (such as the federal government's nationalization of the Alaska Northern Railroad in 1914 and Tanana Valley Railroad in 1917, now both part of the Alaska Railroad, which remained federally-owned until being sold to the state of Alaska in 1985, and, on a larger scale, the nationalization of all U.S. railroads from 1917 to 1920 under the United States Railroad Administration), as well as nationalization of the northeastern freight railroads under Conrail (1976).

List of partially or wholly federally owned enterprises
 Bonneville Power Administration
 Commodity Credit Corporation (CCC)
 Corporation for National and Community Service (AmeriCorps)
 Corporation for Public Broadcasting 
 Export-Import Bank of the United States
 Federal Agricultural Mortgage Corporation
 Farm Credit Banks
 Federal Crop Insurance Corporation (FCIC)
 Federal Deposit Insurance Corporation (FDIC)
 Federal Financing Bank (FFB)
 Federal Home Loan Banks
 Federal Home Loan Mortgage Corporation (Freddie Mac)
 Federal National Mortgage Association (Fannie Mae)
 Federal Prison Industries (UNICOR)
 The Financing Corporation
 Gallaudet University
 Government National Mortgage Association (Ginnie Mae)
 Legal Services Corporation
 Millennium Challenge Corporation (MCC)
 National Cooperative Bank
 National Corporation for Housing Partnerships (NCHP); Washington, D.C.
 National Credit Union Administration Central Liquidity Facility (CLF)
 National Endowment for Democracy
 National Fish and Wildlife Foundation (NFWF)
 National Park Foundation
 National Railroad Passenger Corporation (Amtrak)
 Neighborhood Reinvestment Corporation
 Overseas Private Investment Corporation
 Pennsylvania Avenue Development Corporation; Washington, D.C.
 Pension Benefit Guaranty Corporation
 St. Lawrence Seaway Development Corporation
 Securities Investor Protection Corporation
 Tennessee Valley Authority (TVA)
 United States Postal Service
 YRC Worldwide

Other types in the United States

States and local governments 
There exists a second level of sovereign government in the United States which coexists with the federal government: the individual states of the United States. The vast majority of non-governmental corporations in the United States are chartered by the states of the United States.  This includes most charitable corporations, non-profit corporations, and for-profit corporations. States also have the power to charter corporations that they own, control, or are responsible for the regulation and finance of. These include municipal corporations and state chartered and owned corporations.  State government-chartered and -owned corporations are numerous and provide public services. Examples include North Dakota Mill and Elevator and South Dakota Public Broadcasting. Generally speaking, a statute passed by a state legislature specifically sets up a government-owned company in order to undertake a specific public purpose with public funds or public property. Lotteries in the United States are also run by government corporations, such as the Georgia Lottery Corporation and many others.

Tribal and indigenous governments 
There also exists a third level of sovereign government in the United States: the sovereignty of the Native American tribal governments. As such, the Native American (including Alaska Native) tribal governments have the power to charter corporations and undertake public undertakings that might benefit their citizens, Native Americans are therefore not only citizens of their particular tribes, but also citizens of their respective U.S. states, and of the United States. For example, a tribal council could establish a public service broadcaster along the lines of Ireland's Raidió Teilifís Éireann, partially-fund it with a television license on tribal land, and make up the difference through advertising, thereby making it both a means of uniting the tribe and giving it a voice and a commercial venture by the tribe.

The Alaska Natives are particularly advanced in using their tribal sovereignty to incorporate corporations that are owned by and for the benefit of their tribal citizens and often compete in highly competitive economic sectors through the Alaska Native Regional Corporations. The Native American tribes in the 48 contiguous states often use their sovereignty and their ability to charter to compete using regulatory easements; for instance, Native American tribal corporations often trade in goods that are highly taxed in surrounding states (such as tobacco), or engage in activities that surrounding states have (for reasons of public policy) forbidden, such as the operation of casinos or other gaming establishments. Most of these endeavors have proven very successful for Native American tribal sovereigns and their tribal corporations, bringing wealth into the hands of Native Americans.

References

Further reading 
   This may be a different document than the one cited above.

 
United States